Attilio Palatini (18 November 1889 – 24 August 1949) was an Italian mathematician born in Treviso.

Biography
Palatini was the seventh of the eight children of Michele (1855-1914) and Ilde Furlanetto (1856-1895). In 1900, during the celebrations for the election of his father to Parliament, he was blinded by a young man from Treviso, losing the use of one eye. He completed his secondary studies in Treviso. He graduated in mathematics in 1913 at the University of Padua, where he was a student of Ricci-Curbastro and of Levi-Civita.

He taught rational mechanics at the Universities of Messina, Parma and Pavia. He was mainly involved in absolute differential calculus and in general relativity. Within this latter subject he gave a sound generalization of the variational principle.

In 1919, Palatini wrote an important article where he proposed a new approach to the variational formulation of Einstein's gravitational field equations. In the same paper, Palatini also showed that the variations of Christoffel symbols constitute the coordinate components of a tensor.

He wrote the "Rational Mechanics" and "Theory of relativity" entries for the Hoepli Encyclopedia of Elementary mathematics.

See also
Self-dual Palatini action
Tetradic Palatini action
Palatini identity
Palatini variation

Notes

External links

An Italian short biography of Attilio Palatini in Edizione Nazionale Mathematica Italiana online.

1889 births
1949 deaths
Differential geometers
Italian relativity theorists
19th-century Italian mathematicians
20th-century Italian mathematicians
University of Padua alumni
Academic staff of the University of Pavia
Academic staff of the University of Messina
Academic staff of the University of Parma